The 2015 Bojangles' Southern 500, the 66th running of the event, was a NASCAR Sprint Cup Series race held on September 6, 2015, at Darlington Raceway in Darlington, South Carolina. Contested over 367 laps on the 1.366 mile (2.198 km) egg-shaped speedway, it was the 25th race of the 2015 NASCAR Sprint Cup Series season. Carl Edwards won the race, the 25th of his career. Brad Keselowski finished second. Denny Hamlin, Joey Logano and Kevin Harvick rounded out the top five.

Keselowski won the pole for the race. He led a race high of 196 laps on his way to a runner–up finish. The race had 24 lead changes among 11 different drivers, as well as 18 caution flag periods for 89 laps.

This was the 25th career victory for Carl Edwards, second of the season, first at Darlington Raceway and fifth at the track for Joe Gibbs Racing. The win moved Edwards up to 12th in the drivers points standings 235 behind Kevin Harvick. Despite being the winning manufacturer, Toyota left Darlington trailing Chevrolet by 63–points in the manufacturer standings.

The Bojangles' Southern 500 was carried by NBC Sports on the broadcast NBC network for the American television audience. The radio broadcast for the race was carried by the Motor Racing Network and Sirius XM NASCAR Radio.

Report

Background

Darlington Raceway, nicknamed by many NASCAR fans and drivers as "The Lady in Black" or "The Track Too Tough to Tame" and advertised as a "NASCAR tradition", is a race track built for NASCAR racing located near Darlington, South Carolina. It is of a unique, somewhat egg-shaped design, an oval with the ends of very different configurations, a condition which supposedly arose from the proximity of one end of the track to a minnow pond the owner refused to relocate. This situation makes it very challenging for the crews to set up their cars' handling in a way that will be effective at both ends.

Kevin Harvick entered Darlington with a 43–point lead over Joey Logano. Dale Earnhardt Jr. entered 89 back. Brad Keselowski entered 115 back. Jimmie Johnson entered 116 back.

Return to Labor Day

From 1950 to 2003, the Bojangles' Southern 500 was run on Labor Day weekend in late-August or early-September. For the 2004 season, the race (then known as the Mountain Dew Southern 500) was moved to the penultimate race of the season while a second race at Auto Club Speedway was added into the Labor Day spot. This lasted for five seasons before it moved to October. Atlanta Motor Speedway moved to the Labor Day spot and remained there from 2009 to 2014. During that time, the Southern 500 moved up to Mother's Day weekend in May 2005 and remained there for eight years. It then moved to mid-April for 2014. In August of that year, NASCAR announced that the Southern 500 would return to Labor Day weekend for the first time in 12 years.

Members of the NASCAR media gave their thoughts on the return to Labor Day weekend. Pete Pistone of the Motor Racing Network said that Labor Day weekend in Auto Club "never felt right," Labor Day weekend in Atlanta "was better but still not quite there," that Darlington Raceway "fits like a glove" and is "back to where you belong, Bojangles' Southern 500. Don't ever go away again."

In ESPN.com's weekly Turn 4 series, NASCAR analysts and writers Ricky Craven, Ryan McGhee, John Oreovicz, and Bob Pockrass answered the week's question "Why did it take so long for NASCAR to move the Labor Day race back to Darlington[.]" Craven said that he "wasn't sure" but "[f]ew things are more powerful in sports than the power of tradition. This race is synonymous with Labor Day weekend. Moving it to a spring race felt like inviting Santa Claus to Halloween." McGhee said that going back meant "admitting a mistake. NASCAR doesn't like that. Otherwise, we would have gone back to the 2014 aero package six months ago." Oreovicz said it most likely was because NASCAR "doesn't do anything until [they decide] it's a good idea, no matter how popular the idea might be to the masses. But this is another sign that NASCAR is actually listening to its constituents a bit more these days." Pockrass said that "[s]tubbornness and refusal to admit failure" was his guess and that it was "one of NASCAR's most head-scratching moves in trying to build the sport. NASCAR should have never messed with this tradition in the first place. NASCAR didn't belong in California on Labor Day weekend. It didn't belong in Atlanta. It belongs in Darlington, South Carolina. And it's back. Finally."

Jordan Bianchi of SB Nation said that there are traditions that are "just too important. They are the institutions that shouldn't be tampered with under almost any circumstance, worthy of being shared from one generation to the next." He also added that by returning "Darlington to Labor Day weekend, NASCAR has righted a wrong; even if it was a tradition that should have never been abandoned in the first place."

Mike Hembree of USA Today called the initial decision of moving the race from Labor Day weekend "[s]ports blasphemy of the highest order" and its return to Labor Day weekend as being "back where, as people in this farming section of South Carolina will tell you, God meant it to be."

Change to the track
Since its most recent Sprint Cup Series race in April 2014, Darlington Raceway added  of additional SAFER barrier to both the front and backstretch walls. This made Darlington the second track on the Sprint Cup schedule, after Bristol, to line the entire circumference of the outside retaining wall with the energy-absorbing barrier.

For this race, NASCAR redesigned the restart zone so that it would be more visible and eliminate driver complaints about "jumped restarts."

Aero package
For this race, teams used the low-downforce aero package that was used at Kentucky Speedway. This package included a  spoiler (reduced from ), a  radiator pan (reduced from ) and a quarter inch (.64 cm) leading edge splitter.

New tire compound
For this weekend's race, Goodyear brought a softer tire compound to go with the low-downforce package. These changes included different construction and mold shapes for the left-side tires and the right-side tires would provide more grip.

Throwback paint schemes
In celebration of the event, 32 of the 46 teams entered for this weekend's race unveiled throwback and special paint schemes as part of the return of the Bojangles' Southern 500 to Labor Day weekend. Chip Wile, track president of Darlington Raceway and brainchild of the throwback idea, had initially thought maybe eight or 10 teams could be persuaded to take part in this and get more teams to do it next season. He told Jeff Gluck of USA Today that he thought "this is bigger than what people imagined what it would be in [y]ear [one]" and that he thought "the sport needed this. NASCAR has such a rich history, and we need to celebrate that."

Entry list
The entry list for the 66th annual Bojangles' Southern 500 was released on Sunday, August 28 at 3:12 p.m. Eastern time. Forty-six drivers were entered for the race. All but the No. 25 Hendrick Motorsports Chevrolet were entered for the previous race at Bristol. Jeb Burton and J. J. Yeley swapped rides at BK Racing with Burton driving the No. 23 Toyota and Yeley driving the No. 26 Toyota. Travis Kvapil drove the No. 30 Chevrolet for The Motorsports Group. Timmy Hill drove the No. 62 Chevrolet for Premium Motorsports. T. J. Bell drove the No. 98 Ford for Premium Motorsports.

Practice

First practice
This practice session was the first for any car to use a digital dashboard that all cars will be required to use in 2016.

Final practice
Kyle Busch was forced to his backup car after wrecking his primary an hour into the session.

Qualifying

"I’ve always thought of Darlington as being one of the unique tracks in NASCAR. You look at Bristol, Daytona and Charlotte and Darlington is in the top five of our sport and what it means," Keselowski said. It’s a great accomplishment to me personally." "It’s quite exciting with the way the format is set up with three runs to go for the pole. Each run out you lose so much grip in the tires, it’s a challenge to try to find the right balance and it turns into fun," Kurt Busch said. Our first run out the car was almost too fast. The car almost drove too good." "We were fairly good in the first two rounds. I felt like I could have pushed harder in those two rounds to go faster; and that last round, we just kind of missed the balance on our Chevrolet," Kevin Harvick said. I feel a lot better about it in race trim than I did in qualifying trim. We try to concentrate on that the most because there is so much falloff."

Qualifying results

Race

First half

Start
Under overcast South Carolina evening skies, Brad Keselowski led the field to the green flag at 7:24 p.m. and led the first lap. He pulled to a one-second lead over Kevin Harvick after five laps. The first caution of the race flew on lap 7 for a three-car spin on the backstretch. This began when Brett Moffitt hit the wall while exiting turn 2. In an accordion fashion, Cole Whitt slammed into the rear of his car and Chase Elliott slammed into the rear of his car, sending both of them in a spin.

The race restarted on lap 14. Unlike last year's race, the bottom line appeared to be the preferred restart lane. Unlike the initial start, Keselowski didn't simply pull away as Kurt Busch reeled him in. Suddenly, Matt Kenseth, running third, got real sideways and slapped the wall exiting turn 2. This gave him an unscheduled stop three laps later. Eventually, Keselowski began to pull away from Busch. The second caution flew on lap 44 when Ryan Newman got loose in turn 3, saved it, got loose again, and spun out in turn 4.

The race restarted on lap 51. Debris on the frontstretch brought out the third caution on lap 61. Kasey Kahne opted to make just a two-tire pit stop and exited with the lead. Carl Edwards opted not to pit and assumed that position, putting Kahne in second.

The race restarted on lap 66. That same lap, Edwards was passed by Kahne for the lead. Three laps later, Denny Hamlin, on four new tires, passed Kahne for the lead. The fourth caution flew on lap 108 when Michael Annett got loose in turn 2 and spun down the backstretch.

Second quarter
The race restarted on lap 115. Keselowski drove around the outside of Hamlin in turn 2 to take the lead on lap 119. The fifth caution flew on lap 122 when Mike Bliss cut down his right-front tire on the backstretch and slammed the wall in turn 3. Kyle Busch opted not to pit and assumed the lead.

The race restarted on lap 125. The sixth caution flew on that same lap when J. J. Yeley apparently made contact with Annett in turn 3 and destroyed the protective foam on the driver's side of his car.

The race restarted on lap 133. The seventh caution of the race flew on lap 134 when Jimmie Johnson drifted down into the path of Joey Logano and spun out exiting turn 4.

The race restarted on lap 139. Harvick used the outside to take the lead the next lap, but gave it back to Keselowski on the next lap. The eighth caution of the race flew on lap 165 when Trevor Bayne made heavy contact with Danica Patrick. Trying to get down on pit road, his tires blew and he spun out.

The race restarted on lap 170. Debris on the backstretch brought out the ninth caution of the race on lap 189. This came from when Patrick got loose and slammed the wall exiting turn 4. "I didn’t feel out of control out there," Patrick said. "I felt like I was in a pretty decent rhythm. It snapped pretty hard in (Turn) 4. So, I don’t know, I mean they said it looked like it snapped pretty hard. It felt like that it was definitely more sudden and something that I wasn’t expecting. It is definitely possible that it just got loose. For a few laps before that I felt like I could pull the yaw pretty easily through (Turns) 3 and 4. The one thing about Darlington is you definitely run a lot of lines here. I was running – I felt better lower than higher, so at times I was a lane or two below the dotted line. Debris is just something that happens here because we are using so much track, but I’m not 100 percent sure could have just got loose. But, it could have been a cut tire too, just not sure. It’s a bummer." Tony Stewart was tagged for speeding on pit road and restarted the race from the rear of the field.

Second half

Halfway
The race restarted on lap 195. The 10th caution of the race flew on lap 198 when Ricky Stenhouse Jr. got loose, slid down the track, and slammed the inside wall in turn 4. There, T. J. Bell and Alex Bowman made contact and both slammed the wall.

The race restarted on lap 203. Kurt Busch drove past Keselowski exiting turn 2 to take the lead. The 11th caution of the race flew on lap 208 when Kyle Busch apparently made contact with Greg Biffle sending both spinning. Kyle Larson opted not to pit and assumed the lead.

The race restarted on lap 212. Larson was passed by Stewart for the lead. Later, Hamlin drove under Stewart to retake that position on lap 223. The 12th caution of the race flew on lap 229 when Elliott blew his right-front tire out and hit the outside wall. Hamlin swapped the lead with Harvick on pit road as the former pitted before the start/finish line, and the latter left pit road with the lead.

The race restarted on lap 238. The 13th caution of the race flew on lap 246 when Trevor Bayne cut down his right-rear tire and spun in turn 4. Logano opted not to pit and assumed the lead.

The race restarted on lap 252. The 14th caution of the race flew on lap 265 when David Ragan got loose, slid down the track, and hit the inside wall on the frontstretch. Kyle Busch opted not to pit and assumed the lead.

The race restarted on lap 270. Busch botched the restart and Joey Logano retook the lead. The 15th caution of the race flew on lap 279 when Ragan got hooked into the outside wall by Paul Menard, turned down the track, and slammed the inside wall.

Fourth quarter

The race restarted on lap 283. Debris in turn 1 brought out the 16th caution of the race on lap 300.  Keselowski beat Harvick off pit road to retake the lead.

The race restarted on lap 306. The 17th caution of the race flew with 60 laps to go when Martin Truex Jr. tapped the rear of Kurt Busch and sent him spinning.

The race restarted with 55 laps to go. With 50 to go, Harvick began putting pressure on race leader Keselowski. He had the momentum to pull off the pass exiting turn 2 with 45 to go, but he bobbled on the exit and Keselowski remained in the lead. Edwards pulled to Harvick and began pressuring him for second. Edwards edged Keselowski at the line with 22 laps to go and Brad took back the lead the next lap. The 18th caution of the race, a new track record, came out with 13 laps to go when Jeb Burton made contact with Johnson and spun out. This was a new world record for the most cautions in the Southern 500. Edwards beat Keselowski off pit road to retake the lead.

The race restarted with eight laps to go. Edwards drove off to score his 25th career victory at Darlington Raceway.

Post-race

Driver comments
"This is the style of racing that I love," Edwards said. "If there's any chance we can do it in the Chase, I hope, I hope we can do it."

"Just one spot short at the end," Keselowski said. "We're right there. We've just got to find one more level to win these races and win this championship."

"We had a great Budweiser-Jimmy John's Chevrolet. I'm really happy about that part. I'm really disappointed with how pit road went tonight," Kevin Harvick said after a fifth-place finish. "All in all the car performed well and we were in the race, we just got behind with eight laps to go. "We ran well. We just didn't perform on pit road tonight."

After finishing seventh, Kyle Busch locked himself into the Chase. "We weren’t looking so good after Michigan,’’ Busch said of the 43rd-place finish in the June race. "It was really doom and gloom. I was bumming. I just wasn’t sure what to do. I wasn’t sure what was going on. It took a little bit of that time to get the rust knocked off, I guess. It’s probably the longest I’ve been out of the race car in my life. That was a tough lick.’’

"We lost the handling late in the race and went backwards," said Martin Truex Jr. after finishing ninth. "We were a top-five car all night and to come away ninth is disappointing. We just didn't have the grip at the end to run closer to the front. I would feel better about the team record had we finished in the top-five."

Media comments

Members of the NASCAR media gave their opinions of the second race with the low-downforce aero package. Pete Pistone, lead writer for the Motor Racing Network and co-host of The Morning Drive on Sirius XM NASCAR Radio, said that this race "didn’t seem to have the overall dramatic results like what was seen at Kentucky in July," but that "there were some interesting battles for position during the 500-mile grind, particularly in the closing laps" and that "the drivers were very optimistic heading into the race and gave it glowing reviews after the race."

Jeff Gluck of USA Today said that while "the Southern 500 was a grueling marathon and a caution fest that lasted more than four and a half hours..., it also was a very entertaining race that featured tight battles for the lead and the kind of tire falloff that helped NASCAR rise to popularity in the first place." He also said that it was "exactly what the sport needed – confirmation the package is indeed the right direction to go after Kentucky already was a major success."

Jim Utter of Motorsport.com, factoring in the opinions of drivers and NASCAR on the package, said that if there was "such a thing as a consensus in NASCAR, the low-downforce aerodynamics package debuted at Kentucky earlier this season may be as close as the sport gets to it."

John Oreovicz of ESPN.com said "the star of the show was NASCAR's low drag aero package" and that "[i]f the high-drag package run at Indianapolis and Michigan can almost unquestionably be called a failure, the low-drag package has proven to provide almost everything the drivers have asked for.

Larry McReynolds of Fox Sports said he doesn't "know how in the world anybody can complain about what we saw at Darlington on Sunday night" and that while he understands "the race was long...the racing was good. I know there will be some debate about a four-and-a-half-hour race. I am normally the one that's beating the drum that we don't need to be doing that as our society has outgrown that. This was a very special event, and I don't think it needs to change."

Darrell Waltrip of Fox Sports said he thought "Sunday was a great example of why there is so much passion within our sport about Darlington" and that he thought "the aero package seems to be the way to go. It worked at Kentucky and it seemed to work Sunday night. These cars have a lot of downforce built into the body anyway, so we don't need that big huge spoiler on the back of the car."

Nate Ryan of NBC Sports said that it would "be better if NASCAR bravely calls an audible for the Chase and institutes the low-downforce package that met with smashingly positive reviews at Kentucky Speedway and Darlington Raceway. The mantra from NASCAR over the past six years has been that fan satisfaction should supersede everything in determining its direction. Whether installing double-file restarts or making three attempts at a green-white-checkered finish, there often has been little fair to competitors about the recent initiatives aimed at increasing the entertainment value. The same concept holds true for low downforce."

Race results

Race statistics
24 lead changes among 11 different drivers
18 cautions for 89 laps
Time of race: 4 hours, 28 minute, 35 seconds
Average speed: 
Carl Edwards took home $285,225 in winnings

Race awards
 Coors Light Pole Award: Brad Keselowski (27.492)
 3M Lap Leader: Brad Keselowski (196 laps)
 American Ethanol Green Flag Restart Award: Brad Keselowski
 Duralast Brakes "Bake In The Race" Award: Brad Keselowski
 Freescale "Wide Open": Carl Edwards
 Ingersoll Rand Power Move: Kurt Busch (9 positions)
 MAHLE Clevite Engine Builder of the Race: Roush-Yates Engines, #2
 Mobil 1 Driver of the Race: Brad Keselowski (137.4 driver rating)
 Moog Steering and Suspension Problem Solver of The Race: Carl Edwards (crew chief Darian Grubb (0.228 seconds))
 NASCAR Sprint Cup Leader Bonus: No winner: rolls over to $220,000 at next event
 Sherwin-Williams Fastest Lap: Matt Kenseth (Lap 4, 28.145)
 Sunoco Rookie of The Race: Matt DiBenedetto

Media

Television
NBC Sports covered the race on the television side. Rick Allen, two–time Darlington winner Jeff Burton and Steve Letarte had the call in the booth for the race. As part of the throwback weekend, Ken Squier, Ned Jarrett and Dale Jarrett also called a portion of the race. Dave Burns, Mike Massaro, Marty Snider and Kelli Stavast handled pit road on the television side.

Radio
MRN had the radio call for the race, which was simulcast on Sirius XM NASCAR Radio. Joe Moore, Jeff Striegle and Rusty Wallace called the race from the booth when the field was racing down the front stretch. Dave Moody called the race from a billboard outside of turn 2 when the field was racing through turns 1 and 2. Mike Bagley called the race from atop the Darlington Raceway Club outside of turn 3 when the field was racing through turns 3 and 4. Alex Hayden, Winston Kelley and Steve Post worked pit road on the radio side.

Standings after the race

Drivers' Championship standings

Manufacturers' Championship standings

Note: Only the first sixteen positions are included for the driver standings.

Note
፤፤

References

Bojangles' Southern 500
Bojangles' Southern 500
Historically themed events
NASCAR races at Darlington Raceway
Bojangles' Southern 500